Andrebakely Sud is a town and commune in Madagascar. It belongs to the district of Ambatondrazaka, which is a part of Alaotra-Mangoro Region. The population of the commune is not known.

References and notes 
 Communes - Madacamp
ELABORATION DU PLAN DE GESTION DU SITE RAMSAR D’ALAOTRA

Populated places in Alaotra-Mangoro